Streptomyces angustmyceticus is a bacterium species from the genus Streptomyces. Streptomyces angustmyceticus produces angustmycin.

See also
 List of Streptomyces species

References

Further reading

External links
Type strain of Streptomyces angustmyceticus at BacDive -  the Bacterial Diversity Metadatabase

angustmyceticus
Bacteria described in 2010